ArthurFest was a two-day music festival curated by Arthur Magazine. The festival took place September 4 and 5, 2005 at the Barnsdall Art Park in Los Angeles, California. The lineup included such acts as: Yoko Ono, Sonic Youth, The Black Keys, Modey Lemon, The Time Flys, Winter Flowers, Dead Meadow, Future Pigeon, Dos, Fatso Jetson, the Night Porter, Lavender Diamond, Radar Brothers, Nora Keyes, Geronimo, Six Organs of Admittance, Brightblack Morning Light, Circle, Comets On Fire, Earth, Cat Power, Young Jazz Giants, and Devendra Banhart

On Sunday, August 5, accompanying the festival was a group protesting Yoko Ono for breaking up the Beatles.

References

External links
Arthur Magazine

Rock festivals in the United States